Zaimis (Greek: Ζαΐμης) is a Greek surname and may refer to the following people:

 Alexandros Zaimis (1855-1936), Prime Minister of Greece six times between 1897 and 1928
 Andreas Zaimis (1791–1840), Greek freedom fighter and politician
 Eleanor Zaimis (1915–1982), Greek-British academic
 Georgios Zaimis (b. 1937), Greek sports sailor, Olympic champion in 1960
 Ioannis Zaimis (1797–1882), Greek politician, first Mayor of Patras
 Thrasyvoulos Zaimis (1822–1880), Prime Minister of Greece two times between 1869 and 1872

Greek-language surnames
Surnames